We Had to Remove This Post is a 2021 novella by Dutch writer Hanna Bervoets.

Summary 
The novella follows the story of Kayleigh, who has recently taken a job as a content moderator for social media platform Hexa after accruing a significant amount of debt. Kayleigh and her co-workers initially form tight bonds, however, as time passes and they are subjected to an ever-increasing amount of violent, conspiratorial, and offensive content while being closely surveilled and graded by the company, their relationships begin to break down.

Publishing history 
The novella is the first of Bervoets' works to be published in English, translated by Emma Rault. 600,000 copies of the novel were printed during the first year of its distribution in the Netherlands.

Themes 
The novella examines the social impact of social media and the working conditions of social media content moderators.

Reception 
Johanna Thomas-Corr of The Sunday Times called the novella "a disturbing page-turner about the parts of the internet we don’t see." Kirkus Reviews described the novella as a "scathing, darkly humorous exploration" that "masterfully captures our contemporary moment without devolving into national politics or soapbox rhetoric."

Houman Barekat of The Guardian said that the novella was "nothing if not timely," pointing to the proposed acquisition of Twitter by Elon Musk, but criticised the novel for offering "little in the way of psychological acuity."

References 

Novellas
2021 novels
Dutch fiction